Sana Saeed (born 22 September 1988) is an Indian actress and model, who appears in Bollywood films and Indian television. She also appeared in television shows such as Babul Ka Aangann Chootey Na (2008) and Lo Ho Gayi Pooja Iss Ghar Ki (2008). 

In 2012, Saeed made her big screen debut as an adult in a supporting role in Karan Johar's Student Of The Year, which emerged as a box-office commercial success. She participated in the reality shows Jhalak Dikhhla Jaa 6 (2013), Nach Baliye 7 (2015) and Fear Factor: Khatron Ke Khiladi 7 (2016).

Career
She has appeared as a child artist in critically and commercially successful films such as Kuch Kuch Hota Hai (1998), Badal (2000) and Har Dil Jo Pyar Karega (2000). Saeed also hosted the famous kids program Fox Kids telecasted on Star Plus in which she played the role of Chatur Chachi. She also appeared in television shows such as Babul Ka Aangann Chootey Na on Sony TV and Lo Ho Gayi Pooja Iss Ghar Ki on SAB TV.

She came sixth in the dance reality show and was praised for her energy levels in dancing. Jhalak Dikhla Jaa.

In 2012, She made her screen debut in a supporting role in Karan Johar's Student Of The Year along with the main leads Sidharth Malhotra, Varun Dhawan and Alia Bhatt.
She got noticed due to her child star memory in spite of her small role. Film critic Taran Adarsh from Bollywood Hungama wrote, "Sana Saaed looks glamorous and does well". film critic Komal Nahta commented, "Sana Saeed only gets to pout and flaunt her body as Tanya.".
The film was released on 19 October 2012 in over 1400 screens across the country and garnered positive to mixed reviews from critics and good box office collections. Boxofficeindia declared the film as a semihit after three weeks. She placed 5th in Nach Baliye 7.

In May 2018, Sana appeared in Zee TV's talk show Juzz Baatt as a guest along with Adnan Khan, Arjit Taneja and Karan Jotwani.

Filmography

Films

Television

References

External links

 
 
 

1988 births
21st-century Indian actresses
Actresses from Mumbai
Actresses in Hindi cinema
Actresses in Hindi television
Fear Factor: Khatron Ke Khiladi participants
Indian child actresses
Indian film actresses
Indian television actresses
Living people